"King of the World" is a song by the American rock band Weezer, released as a single on January 14, 2016 for the band's self-titled 2016 album, along with a music video.

Composition
Mark Beaumont of NME said that the song, as well as "LA Girlz", are "noble throwbacks to the quirky grunge of Weezer’s debut".

Reception
Bill Bodkin at Pop-Break opined "Hearkening back to the sound of the Blue and Green albums, and even some of the Red album, “King of the World” kicks ass with classic Weezer crunch." Bodkin also praises Rivers Cuomo's songwriting for the song, stating that he writes with "hope and feel-good vibes". Chris DeVille at Stereogum described the song as "[feeling] like ’90s Weezer with room to breathe."

Live performances
On March 31, 2016, "King of the World" was performed on The Tonight Show Starring Jimmy Fallon in celebration of the release of Weezer's 2016 album. Cuomo was dressed as Elvis Presley during the performance. The song was performed the following day on Good Morning America, where a photo was shot with the band and several Major League Baseball mascots.

Music video
A music video for "King of the World" was released on January 14, 2016, and was directed by Scantron Films. The video features a bearded man in a king's crown and cape, running along a boardwalk, causing havoc, eventually encountering a police officer, who attempts to arrest him.

Charts

Weekly charts

Year-end charts

References

2016 singles
Black-and-white music videos
Songs written by Rivers Cuomo
Weezer songs